MedX Corporation is a privately owned company based in Ocala, Florida. MedX is the manufacture of spinal rehabilitation equipment and premium exercise equipment. MedX equipment was invented by Arthur Jones, who was also the inventor of Nautilus exercise equipment. MedX Equipment includes the MedX Medical Lumbar Machine, Medical Cervical Machine and 25 exercise pieces. MedX Medical Lumbar machine is researched as an effective treatment for back pain.

MedX Research
Google Scholar Research

Research on the MedX Website

External links
MedX Corporation
 MedX Germany
 MedX U.S. Distributor

Ocala, Florida
Companies based in Florida